Daling may refer to:

Places in China
 Daling, Guangdong, town in Huidong County
 Daling, Gongzhuling, town in Jilin
 Daling, Changchun, town in Yushu, Jilin
 Daling Township, Guangxi, in Tantang District, Guigang
 Daling Township, Heilongjiang, former township of Acheng District, Harbin
 Daling Township, Sichuan, in Hanyuan County
 Daling River, river in Northeast China

People with the surname
Janet Daling, American epidemiologist